Noura Ben Slama (born 23 February 1985) is a Tunisian handball player. She plays for the club Cercle Dijon Bourgogne and on the Tunisian national team. She represented Tunisia at the 2013 World Women's Handball Championship in Serbia.

References

1985 births
Living people
Tunisian female handball players
Sportspeople from Nogent-sur-Marne
Expatriate handball players
Tunisian expatriate sportspeople in France
Tunisian expatriate sportspeople in Spain